"Fall at Your Feet" is a 1991 song by Crowded House, from their 1991 album, Woodface. It is the only single from Woodface to be written solely by the group's leader Neil Finn, who co-wrote all other singles from the album with his brother Tim Finn. It peaked at number 17 in the UK, making it Woodfaces second most successful single behind the follow-up, "Weather with You".

The music video was directed by Andrew Dominik.
"Fall at Your Feet" was later released on the group's greatest hits collection Recurring Dream and was performed at the group's farewell performance in 1996, Farewell to the World.

At the APRA Music Awards of 1993, the song won Most Performed Australian Work Overseas.

All the songs available on the various formats were written by Neil Finn, except "Six Months in a Leaky Boat" (written by Tim Finn and Split Enz) and "Something So Strong" (written by Neil Finn and Mitchell Froom).
The track has been covered by James Blunt, English pop punk band Busted, and flamenco guitarist Jesse Cook with singer Danny Wilde. The song was covered by Renée Weldon, Nick Seymour and Conor Brady for the soundtrack to the 2005 Irish drama Trouble with Sex. It also was covered by Glenn Richards (Augie March) for the soundtrack to the 2008 Australian film The Black Balloon. In 2010, Boy & Bear covered the song for a Finn Brothers' covers album, He Will Have His Way which came in at number 5 in Triple J's Hottest 100 for 2010.

Track listings
All tracks album versions taken from albums, except the two Live tracks exclusive to this single.
CD single – Australia, U.S.

 "Fall at Your Feet" – 3:18
 "Whispers and Moans" - 3:40
 "Six Months in a Leaky Boat" (live) - 2:47

 7" single – Australia
"Fall at Your Feet" – 3:18
"Whispers and Moans" – 3:40

 7" single / cassette – Europe
"Fall at Your Feet" – 3:18
"Don't Dream It's Over" – 3:57

 CD single – Europe
"Fall at Your Feet" – 3:18
"Six Months in a Leaky Boat" (live) – 2:47
"Now We're Getting Somewhere" (live) – 4:16
"Something So Strong" – 2:51

 CD single – Europe
"Fall at Your Feet" – 3:18
"Don't Dream It's Over" – 4:03
"Sister Madly" – 2:52
"Better Be Home Soon" – 3:07

Charts

Certifications

References

Crowded House songs
1991 singles
1991 songs
2010 singles
APRA Award winners
Boy & Bear songs
Capitol Records singles
Song recordings produced by Mitchell Froom
Songs written by Neil Finn